Richard Leonard Kuklinski (April 11, 1935 – March 5, 2006), also known as The Iceman, was an American criminal and convicted contract killer.

Kuklinski was engaged in criminal activities for most of his adult life; he ran a burglary ring and distributed pirated pornography. He committed at least five murders between 1980 and 1984. Prosecutors described him as someone who killed for profit. Kuklinski lived with his wife and children in the New Jersey suburb of Dumont. They knew him as a loving father and husband, although one who also had a violent temper. They stated that they were unaware of his crimes. He was given the moniker Iceman by authorities after they discovered that he had frozen the body of one of his victims in an attempt to disguise the time of death.

Kuklinski's modus operandi was to lure men to clandestine meetings with the promise of lucrative business deals, then kill them and steal their money. He also killed two associates to prevent them from becoming informants. Eventually, Kuklinski came to the attention of law enforcement when an investigation into his burglary gang linked him to several murders, as he was the last person to have seen five missing men alive. An eighteen-month-long undercover operation led to his arrest in December 1986. In 1988, he was convicted of four murders and sentenced to life imprisonment. In 2003, he received an additional 30-year sentence after confessing to the murder of a police officer named Peter Calabro.

After his murder convictions, Kuklinski gave interviews to writers, prosecutors, criminologists, and psychiatrists. He claimed to have murdered anywhere from 100 to 200 men, often in gruesome fashion. None of these additional murders have been corroborated.

Kuklinski also claimed to have worked as a hitman for the Mafia. He said he participated in several famous Mafia killings, including the disappearance and presumed murder of Teamsters' president Jimmy Hoffa. Law enforcement and organized crime experts have expressed skepticism about Kuklinski's claimed Mafia ties. He was the subject of three HBO documentaries aired in 1992, 2001 and 2003; several biographies, and a 2012 feature film The Iceman.

Early life
Richard Kuklinski was born in his family's apartment on 4th Street in Jersey City, New Jersey, to Stanley Kuklinski ( Stanisław Kukliński; December 22, 1906 – January 1977), a Polish immigrant from Karwacz, Masovian Voivodeship. His father worked as a brakeman on the Delaware, Lackawanna and Western Railroad. His mother was Anna McNally (January 31, 1911 – March 21, 1972) from Harsimus, a devoutly Catholic first-generation Irish American who worked in a meat-packing plant. He was the second of four children.

According to Kuklinski, his father Stanley was a violent alcoholic who beat his children regularly and sometimes beat his wife. Stanley abandoned the family while Richard was still a child, but returned periodically, usually drunk, and his returns were often followed by more beatings for Richard. Anna Kuklinski reportedly was also often abusive. She would beat Richard with broom handles (sometimes breaking the handle on his body during the assaults) and other household objects. He recalled an incident during his pre-teen years when his mother attempted to kill his father Stanley with a kitchen knife. Anna was a zealous Catholic and believed that stern discipline should be accompanied by a strict religious upbringing. Richard, therefore, was raised in the Roman Catholic Church and served as an altar boy. Kuklinski later rejected Catholicism. He regarded his mother as a "cancer" who destroyed everything she touched.

Kuklinski had three siblings. Kuklinski's brother Joseph was convicted in 1970 of raping a 12-year-old girl and murdering her by throwing her and her dog off the top of a five-story building. When asked about his brother's crimes, Kuklinski replied: "We come from the same father."

Criminal history

Early crimes 
In the mid-1960s, Kuklinski worked at a Manhattan film lab. Through the lab, he accessed master copies of popular films, and he made bootleg copies of Disney animated films to sell. Kuklinski also discovered a lucrative market for tapes of pornographic movies; copying and distributing pornography was a regular source of income for him. He was once arrested for passing a bad check, the only crime he was charged with prior to his arrest for murder. He was photographed and fingerprinted, but the charges were dropped after he agreed to pay back the money owed. Several of his known murder victims were men he met through trafficking pornography and drugs. He also headed a burglary group with Gary Smith, Barbara Deppner, Daniel Deppner, and Percy House.

Murder of George Malliband 
On January 30, 1980, Kuklinski killed George Malliband during a meeting to sell him tapes. Malliband was reportedly carrying $27,000 at the time. Malliband's body was discovered a week later, on February 5, 1980. Kuklinski had placed it in a 55-gallon drum and left it near the Chemitex chemical plant in Jersey City. He cut the tendons of Malliband's leg in order to fit the corpse into the barrel. This was the first murder linked to Kuklinski. Malliband's brother told police officers that Malliband was meeting Kuklinski the day he disappeared. After a plea bargain, Kuklinski admitted to shooting Malliband five times, saying, "It was due to business."

Murder of Paul Hoffman 
In 1982, Kuklinski met Paul Hoffman, a 51-year-old pharmacist who occasionally browsed "the store" in Paterson, New Jersey, a storefront with a back room holding a wide variety of stolen items for sale. Hoffman hoped to make a big profit by purchasing stolen Tagamet, a popular drug to treat peptic ulcers, to re-sell through his pharmacy. He believed Kuklinski could supply the drugs and badgered him to make a deal. Hoffman was last seen on his way to meet Kuklinski with $25,000 to buy prescription drugs from Kuklinski. After a plea bargain, Kuklinski admitted to killing Hoffman on April 29, 1982. He stated that he lured Hoffman into a rented garage and tried to shoot him, but the gun jammed. Instead, he beat Hoffman to death with a tire iron. He said he then stuffed the body into a 55-gallon drum and left it outside a motel in Little Ferry. One day, Kuklinski noticed that the drum had disappeared but never learned what had happened to it. Hoffman's body was never recovered.

Murder of Gary Smith 
By the early 1980s, Kuklinski's burglary gang was under investigation by law enforcement. In December 1982, Percy House, a member of the gang, was arrested. House agreed to inform on Kuklinski and was placed in protective custody. Warrants were also issued for the arrest of two other gang members, Gary Smith and Daniel Deppner. Kuklinski urged them to lay low and rented them a room at the York Motel in North Bergen, New Jersey. Smith left the motel to visit his daughter. Kuklinski feared that Smith, after he discussed going straight, might become an informant.

According to the testimony of Barbara Deppner, Kuklinski, Daniel Deppner, and House (in jail at the time) decided that Smith had to be killed. Kuklinski fed Smith a hamburger laced with cyanide, but when this was slow to work, Daniel Deppner also strangled Smith with a lamp cord. According to forensic pathologist Michael Baden, Smith's death would probably have been attributed to something non-homicidal in nature (such as drug overdose) if Kuklinski relied solely on the poison. However, the ligature mark around Smith's neck, and the fact that the body had been deliberately hidden, proved to investigators that he was murdered.

After Barbara Deppner did not return with a car to move Smith's body, Kuklinski and Daniel Deppner placed it in between the mattress and box spring. Over the next four days, a number of patrons rented the room, and although they thought the smell in the room was odd, most of them did not think to look under the bed. Finally, on December 27, 1982, after more complaints from guests about the smell, the motel manager investigated and discovered the decomposing corpse.

Murder of Daniel Deppner 
After Smith's murder, Kuklinski moved Deppner to an apartment in Bergenfield, New Jersey, belonging to Rich Patterson, then-fiancé of Kuklinski's daughter, Merrick. Patterson was away at the time, but Kuklinski possessed keys to the apartment. Between February and May 1983, Deppner was killed by Kuklinski. Investigators deduced he was murdered in Patterson's apartment after discovering a bloody carpet. Kuklinski enlisted Patterson's help to dispose of Deppner's body, telling Patterson the victim was a friend in trouble with law enforcement and someone had broken in and killed him over the weekend. He added it was best to dump the body to avoid trouble with the police, then forget about the incident. Kuklinski made another mistake when he informed an associate that he had killed Deppner.

Deppner's corpse was discovered May 14, 1983, after a bicyclist riding Clinton Road in a wooded area of West Milford, New Jersey, spotted the corpse surrounded by vultures. Kuklinski wrapped the corpse inside green garbage bags before dumping it. Medical examiners listed Deppner's cause of death as "undetermined," although they noted pinkish spots on his skin, a possible sign of cyanide poisoning. Deppner was also strangled. Investigators guessed that Deppner had already been incapacitated, such as by poison, because the partially-eaten corpse had no defensive wounds and healthy adult men are rarely killed by strangulation. 

The medical examiner found Deppner's stomach full of undigested food, indicating that he had died shortly after (or during) a meal. The beans that Deppner had eaten were burned, so they reasoned the meal was home-cooked because most restaurants would not get away with serving burned food to customers. 

Deppner was the third Kuklinski associate to be found dead.

Louis Masgay discovered 

On September 25, 1983, the body of Louis Masgay was discovered near a town park near Clausland Mountain Road in Orangetown, New York, with a bullet hole in the back of his head. Masgay disappeared over two years earlier, on July 1, 1981, the day he was to meet Kuklinski at a New Jersey diner to purchase a large quantity of blank videocassette recorder tapes, for which Masgay had $95,000 in his van. His body was stored in a freezer, then discovered fifteen months later. After another plea bargain, Kuklinski admitted to shooting Masgay.

However, Kuklinski did not thaw the corpse before he dumped it. He also wrapped it in plastic garbage bags, which kept it insulated and partially frozen. The Rockland County medical examiner found ice crystals inside the body on a warm September day. If the body had thawed before discovery, the medical examiner stated he probably would never have noticed Kuklinski's trickery. Investigators realized Masgay was wearing the clothes his wife and son said he was wearing the day he disappeared. The discovery Kuklinski froze Masgay's corpse encouraged law enforcement officers to nick-name him "Iceman." Newspaper reporters sensationalized Kuklinski's frequently used moniker of "Iceman" in headlines.

Investigation and arrest 
Kuklinski came to the attention of Pat Kane, an officer with the New Jersey State Police, when an informant helped Kane connect him to a gang carrying out burglaries in northern New Jersey. He built a file on him. Eventually, five unsolved homicides—Hoffman, Smith, Deppner, Masgay, and Malliband—were linked to Kuklinski because he was the last person to see each of them alive. A joint task force of law enforcement officials titled "Operation Iceman" was created between the New Jersey Attorney General's office and the Bureau of Alcohol, Tobacco, and Firearms dedicated to arresting and convicting Kuklinski. The ATF was involved due to Kuklinski's firearm sales.

ATF Special Agent Dominick Polifrone went undercover for eighteen months to apprehend Kuklinski. Starting in 1985, Kane and Polifrone worked with Phil Solimene, a close long-time friend of Kuklinski, to get Polifrone close to Kuklinski. Posing as a Mafia-connected criminal named Dominic Provenzano, Polifrone purchased a handgun-muffler combination from Kuklinski. In recordings, Kuklinski discussed a corpse he kept in a freezer for two and a half years. He told Polifrone he preferred poison, saying "Why be messy? You do it nice and calm." He asked Polifrone if he could supply him with pure cyanide. Polifrone told Kuklinski he wanted to hire him to murder a wealthy Jewish cocaine dealer, and recorded Kuklinski speaking in detail about how he would do it. Kuklinski was also recorded boasting he killed a man by putting cyanide on his hamburger, and of his plans to kill "a couple of rats" (Barbara Deppner and Percy House).

On December 17, 1986, Kuklinski met Polifrone to get cyanide for a planned murder, which was to be an attempt on an undercover police officer. After the recorded conversation with Polifrone, Kuklinski went for a walk. He tested Polifrone's (purported) cyanide on a stray dog, using a hamburger as bait, and saw it was not poison. Suspicious, Kuklinski decided not to go through with the planned murder and went home instead. He was arrested at a roadblock two hours later. His wife was charged with disorderly conduct for interfering with his arrest. Officers discovered a firearm in the vehicle, and she was charged with possession of a firearm because she was a passenger.

Trial and incarceration 
Prosecutors charged Kuklinski with five murder counts and six weapons violations, as well as attempted murder, robbery, and attempted robbery. Law enforcement officials said Kuklinski had large sums of money in Swiss bank accounts and a reservation on a flight to that country. Kuklinski was held on a $2million bail bond, and made to surrender his passport. After the arrest, Kuklinski told reporters ″This is unwarranted, unnecessary. These guys watch too many movies.″ At a press conference, New Jersey state Attorney General W. Cary Edwards characterized the motive for the murders as "profit" and said ″He set individuals up for business deals, they disappeared, and the money ended up in his hands.″

At trial, Kuklinski's former associates including Percy House and Barbara Deppner gave evidence against him as did ATF Special Agent Polifrone. The case was prosecuted by Deputy Attorney General Robert Carrol while Kuklinski was represented by a public defender. Kuklinski's lawyer argued Kuklinski had no history of violence, and only projected a "tough image," including his statements to ATF Special Agent Polifrone. The defence theorized Deppner was responsible for the murder of Smith, and there was no cause of death determined for Deppner. Additionally, he argued the testimony of House and Barbara Deppner was unreliable because they lied to law enforcement officials, and House received immunity from prosecution. In March 1988, jurors found Kuklinski guilty of murdering Smith and Deppner, but found the deaths were not proven to be by Kuklinski's conduct, meaning he would not face the death penalty. He was then sentenced to a minimum 60 years in prison.

After the trial, Kuklinski pled guilty to killing Masgay and Malliband. Kuklinski was sentenced to an additional two life sentences to be served consecutively. State prosecutors explained he would spend the rest of his life in prison if he had successful appeals to his previous convictions. Kuklinski also confessed to killing Hoffman, but prosecutors decided not to go to trial as they had a weak case and additional life sentences would not have impacted Kuklinski's prison stay. As part of the plea bargains, the firearm charge against his wife and an unrelated marijuana possession charge against his son were dismissed. Kuklinski was ineligible for parole until 2046, when he would have been 111 years old. He was incarcerated at Trenton State Prison.

During his incarceration, Kuklinski granted interviews to prosecutors, psychiatrists, criminologists, and writers. Several television producers also spoke to Kuklinski about his criminal career, upbringing, and personal life. These talks culminated in three televised documentaries known as The Iceman Tapes, broadcast on HBO in 1992, 2001, and 2003. According to his daughter, Merrick Kuklinski, her mother convinced Richard to do the interviews and she was paid "handsomely" for them. 

In the last installment, The Iceman and the Psychiatrist, Kuklinski was interviewed by renowned forensic psychiatrist Dr. Park Dietz in 2002. Dietz stated he believed Kuklinski suffered from anti-social personality disorder plus paranoid personality disorder. Writers Anthony Bruno and Philip Carlo wrote biographies of Kuklinski. Kuklinski's wife, Barbara, received a share of the profits from the Bruno book.

Additional victims
In various interviews, Kuklinski claimed to have murdered around 200 people. He alleged he used multiple ways to kill people, including a crossbow, icepicks, a bomb attached to remote controlled toy, firearms, grenades, as well as cyanide solution spray he considered to be his favorite. He said he committed his first murder at 14, and murdered homeless people for practice. 

In 2006, Paul Smith, a member of the task force involved in arresting Kuklinski – and later a supervisor of the organized crime division of the New Jersey Attorney General's office – said: "I checked every one of the murders Kuklinski said he committed, and not one was true." He added, "Authorities throughout the country could not corroborate one case based on the tidbits Kuklinski gave." In 2020, Dominick Polifrone said "I don't believe he killed two-hundred people. I don't believe he killed a hundred people. I’ll go as high as 15, maybe."

Kuklinski also alleged he was a Mafia contract killer independently working for all the Five Families of New York City, as well as the DeCavalcante family of New Jersey. He claimed he carried out dozens of murders on behalf of Gambino soldier Roy DeMeo. He said he was one of the murderers of Bonanno family boss Carmine Galante in July 1979, and Gambino family boss Paul Castellano in December 1985. For the Castellano murder, Kuklinski said he was personally recruited by John Gotti ally Sammy Gravano, who instructed him to kill Castellano's driver and bodyguard, Thomas Bilotti. He told Philip Carlo he was hired by John Gotti to kidnap, torture, and murder John Favara, the man who accidentally killed Gotti's 12-year-old son Frank after hitting him with his car.

However, Kuklinski's alleged involvement in mafia hits has been disputed by other authorities. According to Jerry Capeci, "[Philip Carlo] claims the Iceman killed Paul Castellano, Carmine Galante and Jimmy Hoffa, along with Roy DeMeo and about 200 others. C’mon, do you believe that? I don't know anyone who believes that. No one." After he became a government witness in 1990, Sammy Gravano admitted to planning the murder of Castellano and Bilotti, but said the shooters were all members of John Gotti's crew and were chosen by Gotti; he did not mention Kuklinski. Anthony Bruno felt Kuklinski's participation in the killing of Castellano was "highly unlikely". Bruno noted that in 1986 Anthony Indelicato was convicted of Galante's murder and Kuklinski was not mentioned during the trial. Kuklinski biographer Philip Carlo also acknowledged that Kuklinski's claim to have been involved in Galante's murder was untrue. Former Colombo family capo Michael Franzese called Kuklinski a "pathological liar" and said, "I spent 25 years in that life, on the street. I never heard his name mentioned once. Not once."

Kuklinski claimed he dumped bodies in caves in Bucks County, Pennsylvania and fed a victim to rats in the caves. However, in 2013, the Philadelphia Inquirer noted the caves have had a lot of visitors since Kuklinski's time, and no human remains have been discovered. Local cave enthusiast Richard Kranzel also queried the idea of flesh-eating rats, saying "The only rats I encountered in caves are 'cave rats,' and they are reclusive and shy creatures, and definitely not fierce as Kuklinski claims." Law enforcement officers also doubt he stored a corpse for two years in a Mister Softee truck.

Robert Prongay 
In interviews and documentaries, Kuklinski says he killed Robert Prongay, a mentor to him. Prongay was murdered in 1984, shot multiple times in the head, and was subsequently discovered in his Mister Softee ice cream truck. Robbery was not considered a motive at the time. Prongay had been about to go on trial for blowing up the front door of his ex-wife's house. Kuklinski says that Prongay taught him to use cyanide and other methods to kill, and it was Prongay who told him to freeze the body of Masgay. However, Kuklinski says he killed Prongay after he threatened his family. Law enforcement officials have considered Kuklinski a prime suspect in the murder since 1986, but the director of the New Jersey Division of Criminal Justice said no charges were sought because Kuklinski was convicted of other crimes. In 1993, in response to his claims, Hudson County Prosecutor said new charges against Kuklinski were possible since the Prongay murder was still an open investigation, and they would assess whether there was enough evidence to prosecute him. Ultimately, no charges were brought against Kuklinski for the Prongay murder.

Roy DeMeo 
Kuklinski claimed he killed Gambino Crime family member Roy DeMeo in an interview for the 1993 book "The Iceman: The True Story of a Cold-Blooded Killer" by Anthony Bruno. He described DeMeo as a mentor of his, but after he fell behind on a loan to distribute pornography, he received a beating. The two later became business partners. Kuklinski says DeMeo taught him how murder for hire could be a way to make money. However, author Jerry Capeci, who has written extensively about DeMeo and the mafia, doubts Kuklinski killed DeMeo or had close ties to the DeMeo crew. Most sources indicate DeMeo was killed by members of his crew, with no suggestion Kuklinski was involved. Kuklinski is not mentioned in Capeci and Gene Mustain's book about the DeMeo crew, Murder Machine, or Albert DeMeo's account of his father's life in the mob, For the Sins of My Father. Philip Carlo, whose biography of Kuklinski includes the claim that he killed DeMeo, acknowledged in the postscript to a later edition that this claim was probably untrue.

Peter Calabro 
In his 2001 HBO interview, Kuklinski confessed to killing NYPD officer Peter Calabro, who was ambushed and shot dead by an unknown gunman on March 14, 1980. Calabro was rumored to have mob connections and was investigated for selling confidential information to the Gambino family. His wife Carmella drowned under mysterious circumstances three years earlier and members of her family believed Calabro was responsible. At the time, his murder was thought by law enforcement officials to be revenge either carried out or arranged by his deceased wife's relatives. Her brothers were regarded as "key suspects," but the crime remained unsolved.

The Bergen County prosecutor believed Kuklinski's confession to be a fabrication, but his successor decided to proceed with the case. In February 2003, Kuklinski was charged with Calabro's murder, and received another sentence of thirty years. This was considered a waste because it was during multiple life sentences, plus he would be ineligible for parole until he was over the age of 100. Describing the murder, Kuklinski said he parked his van on the side of a narrow road, forcing other drivers to slow to pass. He lay in a snowbank behind his van until Calabro came by at 2 AM, then stepped out and shot him in the head with a sawed-off shotgun, decapitating Calabro. He stated he was unaware that Calabro was a police officer but said he probably would have murdered him anyway.

Kuklinski claimed he was paid to kill Calabro by Gambino crime family soldier (later underboss) Sammy "The Bull" Gravano, and The Bull provided the murder weapon. Gravano, serving a twenty-year sentence in Arizona for drugs, was also indicted for the murder. Kuklinski was set to testify against him. Gravano denied any involvement in Calabro's death and rejected a plea bargain, under which, he would receive no additional jail time if he confessed to the crime and informed on all his accomplices. The charges against Gravano were dropped after Kuklinski's death in 2006.

Jimmy Hoffa 
In his 2001 HBO interview, Secrets of a Mafia Hitman, Kuklinski said he knew who killed former Teamsters union president Jimmy Hoffa. Kuklinski did not claim any personal involvement in Hoffa's disappearance and presumed murder and did not identify any culprit. However, he later claimed he killed Hoffa. In his account, Kuklinski was part of a four-man kidnap team. They grabbed Hoffa in Detroit. While they were in the car, Kuklinski killed Hoffa by stabbing him with a large hunting knife. He said he drove Hoffa's corpse from Detroit to a New Jersey junkyard. It was placed in a drum, set on fire, and then buried in the junkyard. Later, fearing an accomplice might snitch, the drum was disenterred, placed in the trunk of a car, and compacted into a cube. It was sold as scrap metal along with hundreds of other compacted cars. It was shipped off to Japan to be used in making new cars.

Deputy Chief Bob Buccino, who worked on the Kuklinski case, said "They took a body from Detroit, where they have one of the biggest lakes in the world, and drove it all the way back to New Jersey? Come on." Buccino added: "We didn't believe a lot of things he said." Former FBI Special Agent Robert Garrity stated Kuklinski's admission to killing Hoffa was "a hoax," and that Kuklinski was never a suspect in Hoffa's disappearance, adding "I never heard of him." Anthony Bruno said he investigated Kuklinski's alleged involvement in Hoffa's disappearance but felt "[his] story didn't check out." He opined Kuklinski made the confession to "add extra value to his brand", and so, he omitted the story from his biography of Kuklinski.

Personal life
Kuklinski's first wife, Linda, was nine years his senior. They had two sons, Richard Jr. and David. While working for a trucking company, he met Barbara Pedrici, a secretary at the same firm. Richard and Linda divorced, and he married Barbara in September 1961, and had two daughters, Merrick and Christin, and a son, Dwayne. Barbara described his behavior as alternating between "good Richie" and "bad Richie." "Good Richie" was a hard-working provider and an affectionate father and loving husband, who enjoyed time with his family. Barbara remembered that when Merrick became seriously ill soon after she was born, Richard stayed up night after night to care for her.

In contrast, "Bad Richie" – who would appear at irregular intervals: sometimes one day after another, other times not appearing for months – was prone to unpredictable fits of rage, smashing furniture and domestic violence. During these periods, he was physically abusive to his wife (one time breaking her nose and giving her a black eye) and emotionally abusive towards his children. Merrick later recalled that he once killed her dog right in front of her to punish her for coming home late. 

Barbara stated that she had once told Richard she wanted to see other people. He responded by silently jabbing her from behind with a hunting knife so sharp she did not even feel the blade go in. He told her that she belonged to him and that if she tried to leave, he would kill her entire family; when Barbara began screaming at him in anger, he throttled her into unconsciousness. Merrick also remembered a number of road rage incidents involving her father.

Kuklinski's family and Dumont, New Jersey neighbors were unaware of his activities, and instead believed he was a successful businessman. Barbara described him as a "wholesale distributor" and said he employed an accountant. She did suspect that some of his income was from illegal activities, due to their lifestyle and the large amounts of cash he often possessed. However, given his volatility, she never expressed these worries to him, instead maintaining a "don't ask questions" philosophy when it came to his business life or associates. If Richard suddenly left the house in the middle of the night, Barbara would never ask where he was going. The Kuklinskis divorced in 1993, when Richard was in prison. Barbara said the divorce was for "money reasons." She continued to visit him in prison, but only about once a year. On June 6, 1984, Kuklinski filed for personal bankruptcy listing debts of $160,697, and assets of only $300.

Death
In October 2005, after nearly 18 years in prison, Kuklinski was diagnosed with Kawasaki disease (an inflammation of the blood vessels). He was transferred to a secure wing at St. Francis Medical Center in Trenton, New Jersey. Although he had asked doctors to make sure they revived him if he developed cardiopulmonary arrest (or risk of heart attack), his then-former wife Barbara had signed a "do not resuscitate" order. A week before his death, the hospital called Barbara to ask if she wished to rescind the instruction, but she declined. 

Kuklinski died at age 70 on March 5, 2006. At the request of Kuklinski's family, noted forensic pathologist Michael Baden reviewed his autopsy report. Baden confirmed that Kuklinski died of cardiac arrest and had been suffering with heart disease and phlebitis.

Michael Shannon played Kuklinski in the 2012 film The Iceman loosely based on Anthony Bruno's book The Iceman: The True Story of a Cold-Blooded Killer. The film was directed by Ariel Vromen and also stars Winona Ryder, Ray Liotta, Stephen Dorff, and Chris Evans. Another movie about Kuklinski which was to star Mickey Rourke in the title role was announced in 2010 but ultimately never made.

References

Further reading

External links

 New Jersey Department of Law & Public Safety - Division of Criminal Justice 1987 Annual Report 
 

1935 births
2006 deaths
20th-century American criminals
American male criminals
American murderers
American people convicted of murder
American people convicted of murdering police officers
American gangsters of Irish descent
American people who died in prison custody
American prisoners sentenced to life imprisonment
Crime in New Jersey
Criminals from New Jersey
Deaths from vasculitis
Male murderers
People convicted of murder by New Jersey
People from Dumont, New Jersey
People from Jersey City, New Jersey
People with antisocial personality disorder
People with paranoid personality disorder
Prisoners sentenced to life imprisonment by New Jersey
Prisoners who died in New Jersey detention
Former Roman Catholics